Marek Výbošťok (born 9 May 2002) is a Slovak professional footballer who plays for Rača as a midfielder.

Club career

MŠK Žilina
Výbošťok made his professional Fortuna Liga debut for Pohronie during an away fixture against Spartak Trnava on 25 July 2021. He came on in the second half to replace Dominik Špiriak. Pohronie went on to lose the game 2–0.

References

External links
 
 Futbalnet profile 
 

2002 births
Living people
People from Detva
Sportspeople from the Banská Bystrica Region
Slovak footballers
Association football midfielders
FK Pohronie players
MFK Nová Baňa players
FK Rača players
Slovak Super Liga players
2. Liga (Slovakia) players
3. Liga (Slovakia) players